The 2006 Tunisia LG Cup It is the 18th edition of the international friendly football tournament, the LG Cup, which was played in Tunisia between May 30 and June 2, 2006 at the 7 November Stadium, with the participation of four teams: Tunisia, Uruguay, Libya and Belarus. The Uruguay national team won it after defeating Tunisia in the final match.

Participants 
The participants were:

Venue

Results
All times local: CET (UTC+1)

Semifinals

Third place match

Final

Statistics

Goalscorers 
There were 8 goals scored in 4 matches, for an average of 2 goals per match.

1 goal

  Hamed Namouchi
  Francileudo Santos
  Issam Jemâa
  Tarik El Taib
  Walid Ali Osman
  Nicolas Vigneri
  Sebastian Abreu
  Syarhey Shtanyuk

Tournament team rankings 
As per statistical convention in football, matches decided in extra time are counted as wins and losses, while matches decided by penalty shoot-outs are counted as draws.

External links 

 Details at RSSSF

References

International association football competitions hosted by Tunisia